Benjamin Pulimood was the Director/Principal of the Christian Medical College & Hospital, Vellore, Tamil Nadu, India.

Education
He passed out of the Government Medical College, Thiruvananthapuram
in 1957 and joined Christian Medical College & Hospital, Vellore, which was the premier medical institution those days. He went to England and got MRCP in 1962 from Edinburgh and later FRCP in 1973.

Physician
All along he was at the Christian Medical College, Vellore where he was a professor from 1969 to 1995. He was Principal during 1981 to 1987 and was director from 1987 to 1994. He was a venerated figure in Gastroenterology even before the advent of modern techniques like endoscopy, SCAN (Schedules for Clinical Assessment in Neuropsychiatry) and Magnetic resonance imaging (MRI).

Sportsman
He was a keen sportsman who had played as a goalkeeper in Santosh trophy tournament of 1954-55 and was also a member of the State team for the national hockey tournament in 1952 representing the State of Travancore-Cochin.

Other responsibilities
He was the president of the Indian Society of Gastroenterology and chairman of the Kanigiri Hospital governing council. He represented the Mar Thoma Church in the World Council of Churches at Nairobi and is the recipient of the Manva Seva Award of the Mar Thoma Church.

Last days
He died in Vellore on Saturday 5 February 2011. The funeral was at Salem Mar Thoma Church cemetery at Kochi on Wednesday 9 February.

He was survived by his wife Dr. Ramani, (daughter of Rev. T.C.Thomas); a daughter Dr. Ansu and two sons Mani Pulimood and Dr. Thomas Pulimood.

References 

2011 deaths
Mar Thoma Syrian Church
Malayali people
Year of birth missing
People from Vellore
Indian gastroenterologists
Medical doctors from Thiruvananthapuram
20th-century Indian medical doctors
Medical doctors from Tamil Nadu